Imagitec Design was a video games development company founded in 1989, based in the UK. The main person involved was Barry Leitch, who worked as a composer for many of the company's soundtracks.

Imagitec Design interacted with other companies such as Atari Corporation, Gremlin Interactive, and Electronic Arts. In early 1997 Imagitec was purchased by Gremlin and became part of Gremlin Interactive Studios.

Games

 American Gladiators
 Butcher Hill
 Blood Valley
 Bubsy in Fractured Furry Tales
 Combo Racer
 Daemonsgate
 Dwagons - Unreleased Mega Drive game
 Freelancer 2120 - Unreleased Atari Jaguar CD game
 The Gadget Twins
 Gemini Wing
 The Humans
 I-War
 Netherworld
 Prophecy I - The Viking Child
 Raiden
 Ratpack
 Snow White: Happily Ever After
 Space Junk - Unfinished Atari Falcon game
 Stratego
 Suspicious Cargo
 Tempest 2000
 Viking Child
 Zone Warrior

References

External links

Defunct video game companies of the United Kingdom
Video game companies established in 1989
Video game companies disestablished in 1995